Fulkerson is a surname. Notable people with the surname include:

Aaron Fulkerson, IT businessman and founder of MindTouch, Inc
Abram Fulkerson (1834–1902), Confederate officer during the American Civil War, Virginia lawyer, politician
D. R. Fulkerson (1924–1976), mathematician who co-developed the Ford-Fulkerson algorithm
Frank B. Fulkerson (1866–1936), U.S. Representative from Missouri
Gregg Fulkerson, former leader of 80s AOR/melodic hard rock band Blue Tears
James Fulkerson (born 1945), American composer, now living in the Netherlands

See also
Fulkerson, Missouri, an unincorporated community in the United States
Fulkerson, Virginia, an unincorporated community in the United States
Ford–Fulkerson algorithm computes the maximum flow in a flow network
Fulkerson Prize for outstanding papers in the area of discrete mathematics